Yassıkışla is a village in the Göynücek District, Amasya Province, Turkey. Its population is 73 (2021).

References

Villages in Göynücek District